Mather is an unincorporated community in Tuolumne County, California, United States. The community is named after Stephen Tyng Mather, who directed the National Park Service from 1917 to 1929.

References

Unincorporated communities in Tuolumne County, California
Unincorporated communities in California